The Bogus Witch Project is a 2000 American comedy film directed by Victor Kargan and starring Pauly Shore. It satirizes The Blair Witch Project. It uses different tellings of the Blair Witch, such as The Blair Underwood Project. The film was released direct-to-DVD on October 10, 2000.

Cast
Pauly Shore - Host
The Griffith Witch Project
Steve Agee
Kelly Aluise (credited as Kelly Anne Conroy)
The Willy Witch Project
Susan Johnson

Reception
The Bogus Witch Project received negative reviews from critics. The film holds a 0% approval rating on Rotten Tomatoes, based on five reviews with an average rating of 1.14/10.

Alex Sandell of Juicy Cerebellum commented: "How could Pauly Shore get worse?!? Seriously. How???; Bobby Ludbrook called it "One of the worst spoofs i have ever seen", and Clint Morris of Moviehole suggested to "take this out to the woods, bury it and be done with it".

References

External links

2000 films
American parody films
2000s English-language films
2000s parody films
Trimark Pictures films
2000 horror films
Blair Witch parodies
2000 comedy films
2000s American films